The Grimoire was a comic book series published by Speakeasy Comics in 2005. A contemporary fantasy story, The Grimoire was created by writer Sebastien Caisse and art studio Grafiksismik.

Publication history 
The series, went through a creative team change right after the completion of its first story-arc, which ended with issue #6. A creative difference between the creators and publisher, along with alleged problems over payments, put the collaboration to a halt during the summer of 2005.

Editor Chris Stone took over the writing chores for the series. Of the new team and storyline, only issue #7 was published before the publisher Speakeasy Comics closed on February 27, 2006.

Plot 
The Grimoire is passed to Amandine from a mysterious masked stranger. The object's curse it that whoever holds it will find her fate bound to it. So what begins as a walk to a friend's house becomes the first steps of an incredible adventure...

Characters 
 Amandine — the main character, she is a lonely girl surrounded by material wealth
 Medea — a powerful witch, she is Amandine's mother
 Eric Faucon — Amandine's father
 Chai — a magical, intelligent raccoon who speaks Faeric; he is Eric's former familiar
 Louis Bigsky — chieftain of the Western minotaur tribes

References 
 Contino, Jennifer M. "SEBASTIEN CAISSE & THE GRIMOIRE," Comicon.com (Mar. 2, 2005).

External links
 Grafiksismik

Fantasy comics
2005 comics debuts
Speakeasy Comics titles